Sowmya Menon is an Indian actress who predominantly appears in Malayalam films. She made her movie debut in the 2018 Malayalam film Kinavalli. She played the leading role in the Malayalam movie Children's Park followed by movies like Margamkali and Fancy Dress.

Filmography

Movies

Upcoming projects 
Sowmya Menon is set to make her Kannada debut with the biopic on reformed underworld don Muthappa Rai. The Ravi Srivatsa directorial venture will have Sowmya playing the female lead.

Music videos

References

External links
 
 

Living people
Indian female dancers
Indian female models
Year of birth missing (living people)